Oliver Haze  is a Montreal-based Canadian composer-songwriter and performer, having shared the stage with the likes of Nelly Furtado, David Usher, The Tea Party, Big Sugar and many more.  His hit single, "Holy Water" reached number one on the BDS charts in Quebec. He also made a cover of Duran Duran's "Save a Prayer", another song from his debut album Wandering Trip (2001). Collaborators on his album included producers John Webster (who has worked with Aerosmith and Tom Cochrane), Terry Brown (Rush), and Al Sutton (Kid Rock).

Charted songs in Canada
"My World Is you" (2000) reached No. 2, 11 weeks in the charts
"Holy Water" (2001) reached No. 2, 15 weeks in the charts
"Save a Prayer" (2001) reached No. 14, 12 weeks in the charts

Sources

Bibliothèque et Archives nationales du Québec, Palmarès anglophone et allophone – Compilation des succès par ordre alphabétique d'interprètes (Compilation of rankings in Anglophone and Francophone Record charts in alphabetical order by performer), p 497
Drouin, Serge, Le groupe Tailor Made Fable se pointe aux États-Unis, Journal de Québec 11 March 2010
MuchMusic Playlist for week ending 30 June 2001, Billboard, 30 June 2001, p. 68
Pereira, Lia, Oliver Haze, Cidade FM
Réseau Centre, Tailor Made Fable en spectacle, 2009
Ventura, Luís, A vida inspira-me... (Interview with Oliver Haze), ON LINE NEWS Aveiro Portugal,  23 October 2002

Canadian male singer-songwriters
Living people
Year of birth uncertain
Musicians from Montreal
Place of birth missing (living people)
Year of birth missing (living people)